Tyler James LaTorre (born April 22, 1983) is an American baseball coach and former professional baseball catcher. He is the pitching coach at Sacramento State University. LaTorre played college baseball at University of California, Davis from 2003 to 2006 for coach Rex Peters before going on to a professional career from 2006 to 2016. He played for Team Italy in the 2013 World Baseball Classic.

References

External links

1983 births
Living people
Baseball players from California
Baseball catchers
Salem-Keizer Volcanoes players
San Jose Giants players
Arizona League Giants players
Connecticut Defenders players
Richmond Flying Squirrels players
Fresno Grizzlies players
Biloxi Shuckers players
Unipol Bologna players
San Jose State Spartans baseball coaches
Sacramento State Hornets baseball coaches